Pycnoplinthus is a genus of flowering plants belonging to the family Brassicaceae.

Its native range is Western Himalaya.

Species:
 Pycnoplinthus uniflora (Hook.f. & Thomson) O.E.Schulz

References

Brassicaceae
Brassicaceae genera